Robert Storey may refer to:

Robert H. Storey (born 1942), Canadian bobsledder
Robert D. Storey (born 1936), lawyer, philanthropist, university trustee, and corporate director
Rob Storey (William Robson Storey, born 1936), New Zealand politician
Rob Storey (Home and Away), a fictional character in the Australian soap opera Home and Away
Bob Storey (born 1945), Canadian football player
Bobby Storey (1956-2020), Irish republican

See also
Robert Story (disambiguation)